Anil Kanti "Neil" Basu  (born 1968) is a senior British police officer. Basu is currently a Non-Executive Director of the College of Policing, leading the strategic command course which prepares police officers and staff for promotion to the most senior ranks in the service.  Basu is also part of the National Police Chiefs' Council's scrutiny board for police action plan on inclusion and race. 

From March 2018 to September 2021, he served as Assistant Commissioner for Specialist Operations in the Metropolitan Police Service, and the National Police Chiefs' Council lead for Counter Terrorism Policing.

Basu left the Metropolitan Police at the end of November 2022.

Career
Basu became a police officer in 1992, and has spent his whole career serving with the Metropolitan Police Service. He is currently the most senior serving British police officer of Asian heritage: his father was from Kolkata, India and his mother was from Wales.

In 2018, Basu received the Asian Achievers Award for Achievement in Uniformed and Civil Services.

During the George Floyd protests, Basu spoke out about racism in policing, stating he was "horrified" by George Floyd's murder.

Basu has stated he believes British policing is institutionally racist, criticising other senior British police officers for their reluctance to agree.

Following the resignation of Lynne Owens as Director-General of the National Crime Agency, Basu was one of the final candidates considered to replaced Owens until the Home Office restarted the selection process in May 2022.

Honours

References

1968 births
Living people
Assistant Commissioners of Police of the Metropolis
British people of Indian descent
Counterterrorism in the United Kingdom
English recipients of the Queen's Police Medal
Metropolitan Police recipients of the Queen's Police Medal